= Abraham Lopez de Oliveira =

Abraham Lopez de Oliveira was a Dutch Jewish engraver who worked in Amsterdam in the 18th century.
